David Gaffney is a British writer well known for his flash fiction.

His work has appeared in such publications as Flash: The International Short-Short Story Magazine, Bad Idea, and Ambit.

He was the 2015 flash-fiction judge for the Bridport Prize.

Collections
Sawn-Off Tales (2006)
Aromabingo (2009)
The Half-Life of Songs (2010)
More Sawn-Off Tales (2013)

Novels

Never Never (2008)

All The Places I've Ever Lived (2017)

The Three Rooms in Valerie's Head (2018)

References

External links
 David Gaffney, author's official homepage
 Flash: The International Short-Short Story Magazine

Living people
British writers
Year of birth missing (living people)
Place of birth missing (living people)